Klikk is an Indian subscription video on-demand and over-the-top streaming service, owned and maintained by Angel Television Private Limited with headquarters in Kolkata, India.

History 
Early in 1986, Angel Television Private Limited founded in Kolkata, India and started its business with movie acquisitions. In the year 2020, when Klikk was launched by Vikas Tantiya, the company got transformed into a fully vertically integrated studio.

A short videos sharing mobile app Chingari was collaborated with Klikk in 2021.

KliKK is available for Android, iOS, Amazon Fire TV, Android TV, Jio Store and Mi TV.

Content 
Klikk focuses on original web series, feature films, short films, animated films along with a library of over 1000 Bengali language films across many genres.

Releases

References

External links 
Official Website

Companies based in Kolkata
Indian brands
Streaming media systems
Video on demand services
Indian companies established in 2020
2020 establishments in West Bengal